Scudderia curvicauda is a species in the family Tettigoniidae ("katydids"), in the order Orthoptera ("grasshoppers, crickets, katydids"). A common name for Scudderia curvicauda is "curve-tailed bush katydid". Scudderia curvicauda is found in North America.

References

Further reading
 
 Field Guide To Grasshoppers, Katydids, And Crickets Of The United States, Capinera, Scott, Walker. 2004. Cornell University Press.
 Otte, Daniel (1997). Tettigonioidea. Orthoptera Species File 7, 373.

External links
NCBI Taxonomy Browser, Scudderia curvicauda

Scudderia
Insects described in 1773
Taxa named by Charles De Geer